There are many glaciers in the Antarctic. This set of lists does not include ice sheets, ice caps or ice fields, such as the Antarctic ice sheet, but includes glacial features that are defined by their flow, rather than general bodies of ice. The lists include outlet glaciers, valley glaciers, cirque glaciers, tidewater glaciers and ice streams. Ice streams are a type of glacier and many of them have "glacier" in their name, e.g. Pine Island Glacier. Ice shelves are listed separately in the List of Antarctic ice shelves. For the purposes of these lists, the Antarctic is defined as any latitude further south than 60° (the continental limit according to the Antarctic Treaty System).

List by letters 

 List of glaciers in the Antarctic: A–H
 List of glaciers in the Antarctic: I–Z

See also 
 List of Antarctic and subantarctic islands 
 List of Antarctic ice rises
 List of Antarctic ice shelves
 List of Antarctic ice streams
 List of glaciers
 List of subantarctic glaciers

References 

 

</noinclude>

Glaciers
Antarctic